Overthrust is a four-piece death metal band from Ghanzi, Botswana.

History 
Overthrust was formed in 2008 in Ghanzi, Botswana. The band currently consists of vocalist and bassist Tshomarelo "Vulture Thrust" Mosaka, lead guitarist Shalton "Spencer Thrust" Monnawadikgang, rhythm guitarist Tshepho "Dawg Thrust" Kaisara and drummer Balatedi "Beast Thrust"  Folai. The previous drummer Gakeitse "Suicide Torment" Bothalentwa passed away on December 25, 2018, after being hit by a car driven by a drunkard in a public bar in Ghanzi, Botswana. The band then replaced him with his uncle, Beast Thrust who was actually the very first Overthrust drummer and also had taught the late drummer-Suicide drums.

Overthrust recorded their first single album "FREEDOM IN THE DARK" at Stux Daemon Studio in Tlokweng on April 10, 2011, and  Recorded the second album in December 2014 at "Metal Records" in Gaborone, which was produced by Ivo Sbrana and Giuseppe Sbrana of Skinflint, this first full-length album Desecrated Deeds to Decease was then released on May 26, 2015. The Katutura and Brutal Africa Splits and were released in March and September respectively. The latest Album "Suicide Torment" was recorded at Village Sound Studio by Leroy Nyoni and Mastered and Mixed in Florida at Indian River Music Company by Jason Banning.

The band self-organizes both their  small and big metal festival such as their annual Overthrust Winter Metal Mania Fest which is a charity event that has been going for 10 years now and specializes in caring for the disadvantaged and disabled children in society and local AIDS-campaign. The band toured Holland, Finland, Belgium, Angola, South Africa, Germany and Switzerland for the first time in Summer 2016 then 2017, 2018 and played have Wacken Open Air in 2016 and the International Sommerfestival in Hamburg.

Overthrust Achievements
Overthrust did play more than 100 festivals including both local and international shows since 2010. In May 2012 Overthrust scooped position 1 during Botswana President Day Competitions Live Music Category. 2015, Overthrust was awarded and nominated the best deathmetal band in Africa by African Metal Committee. 2016 August, Overthrust did tour Europe and played shows in Germany and Switzerland and also played the world biggest heavy metal show "Wacken Open Air Fest" and also International Summer Festival at Kampnagel in Hamburg. 2017 September, Overthrust became the first African metal band to play 12 shows in a row during European Tour and did play in Karlsruhe, Freiburg, Oostburg, Groiningen, Bremen, Rostock, Berlin, Bielefeld, Troisdorf, Mainz, Mannheim and Hamburg.

Media That Covered Overthrust
Overthrust did appear in World international media houses such a BBC, CNN, DW, VISE MAGAZINE, METAL HAMMER, SABC, REDBULL TV, MTV, BTV, ETV, etc.

Overthrust Tours; 
2013: Pretoria, Johannesburg, Cape Town (Metal for Africa Tour)
2015: Pretoria (African Crossing Country Gorofest)
2016: Germany, Switzerland
2017: Angola (Luanda, Huambo)
2017: Germany, Holland and Belgium cities
2018: Finland (Helsinki, Tampere)
2019: Johannesburg-South Africa (Spawn fest)
2020: Cape Town-South Africa (Metal for Africa Tour)

Overthrust Winter Metal Mania Charity Fest Links

Overthrust metal band organizes an annual Charity festival titled: Overthrust Winter Metal Mania Fest. The event is held each and every MAY of the year in Ghanzi, Botswana and has been running for 11 years now. Proceeds of the event are donated to the disadvantaged children in the community of Ghanzi and surroundings in form of food baskets, clothing, toiletry etc...Through office of Social and Community Development and District Commissioner. This is also a very special, unique and real entertaining event with a scene of a "movie like" atmosphere where metalheads/Rockers (Marock) are heavily dressed in their leather outfits and spikes, cowboy boots and hats, chains and motorbikes, horses and doing Gorilla walks and marches against poverty.

They were nominated 'Breakthrough African Band' at the 2021 Global Metal Apocalypse awards, they finished joint 4th with Ortho'doxs (Madagascar) and Dividing The Element (Zimbabwe), they were also nominated 'Breakthrough International Band' and finished 7th.

Musical style 
The band performs onstage in black leather clothes, bandanas, belts and cowboy hats. Overthrust is a 4 piece old school death metal band from Ghanzi, Botswana, It was formed towards the end of 2008 and the band became active in 2010.This band was formed by Tshomarelo Mosaka aka Vulture Thrust in 2007 with Shalton Monnawadikgang aka Spencer Thrust -2008 and the late Gakeitse Bothalentwa aka Suicide Torment(RIP) -2008. Balatedi Folai aka Beast Thrust, Lepololang Malepe aka Godfather and Tshepho Kaisara aka Dawg Thrust joined Overthrust in January 2009, July 2011 and April 2013 Respectively. Old Wrust, Deicide, Cannibal Corpse, Morbid Angel, Immolation, Obituary and most of Florida old school death metal bands, heavily influences Overthrust. Overthrust theme of songs is about Purgatory, Death and False Preachers. Overthrust recorded a single album-Freedom in the dark in April 2011, and 9-track debut album (Desecrated deeds to decease) was released in May 2015. Six tracks EP (Suicide Torment) was released on 20 December 2019. Demon grave single was released in August 2020. The fourth album (Infected by myth) recording has been postponed to December 2021 due to Corona virus pandemic.

The musicians say they play oldschool death metal. The musicians were inspired to form their own band by artists like Deicide, Morbid Angel, Broken Hope, Cannibal Corpse, Obituary, Carcass and Autopsy. The music is comparable with Florida death metal bands like Mantas, Aggressor and Dead.

The vocals are compared to Glen Benton of Deicide, Lemmy Kilmister of Motörhead 's dress style / fashion is considered an influence to Botswana's cowboy metalheads fashion. Kilmister was one person who helped the Botswana metal scene to rise.

Discography 
 2011: Freedom in the dark
 2015: Desecrated Deeds to Decease
 2018 Katutura split
 Brutal Africa split
 2019: Suicide Torment
 2020: Demon grave

References

External links 
 Overthrust at Facebook

Botswana death metal musical groups
Musical groups established in 2008
2008 establishments in Botswana